Pamela Gail Coxson is an American applied mathematician specialized in disease modelling. She is a specialist in the division of general and internal medicine at the University of California, San Francisco Center for Vulnerable Populations.

Life 
Coxson was born to Ferne and Richard Coxson. She completed a Ph.D. in mathematics from University of Southern California. Her 1979 dissertation was titled On the equivalence between open loop and closed loop control laws for linear systems.  was her doctoral advisor.

In 1985, while working as a fellow at the Mary Ingraham Bunting Institute, Coxson initiated the Association for Women in Mathematics' Sonia Kovalevsky Math Day program for female high schoolers and their teachers. In 1986, Coxson was a visiting assistant professor of mathematics at Ohio State University. One of her mentors was Violet B. Haas, whom she met in 1983.

Coxson has worked in several areas of applied mathematics including  mathematics in pharmacokinetics, catalytic cracking of oil, satellite image processing, and medical imaging. She is a mathematician working as a specialist in the division of general and internal medicine at the University of California, San Francisco Center for Vulnerable Populations (CVP). Coxson is part of the CVP cardiovascular vascular disease modelling group.

References

Citations

Bibliography 

Living people
Year of birth missing (living people)
Place of birth missing (living people)
American women mathematicians
Applied mathematicians
20th-century American mathematicians
20th-century women mathematicians
21st-century women mathematicians
21st-century American mathematicians
American medical researchers
Women medical researchers
University of Southern California alumni
UCSF School of Medicine faculty
20th-century American women scientists
21st-century American women scientists